Rutherford County Virtual School is a virtual school in the Rutherford County school district located in Smyrna, Tennessee, United States. The school serves grades 3 to 12. All students who are residents of Rutherford County can enroll in the school. This school is the first virtual school to open in the county in 2020 with an enrollment of 189 students.

History
Rutherford County Virtual School was founded in 2020 as the 49th school to open in the school district. The first principal and current of the Rutherford County Virtual School is Dr. Jessica Supakhan.

Curriculum
Rutherford County Virtual School uses the Connections Academy (or Pearson Connexus) platform to deliver education to students. Elementary and middle school grade students are taught by teachers who work at Rutherford County Schools. Courses at the school are taught by certified teachers in the State of Tennessee.

Athletics
Rutherford County Virtual School has a co-op partnership with Central Magnet School, allowing Rutherford County Virtual School students to participate in athletic programs from Central Magnet School. There are currently 12 varsity teams in a co-op partnership, which include baseball, boys and girls basketball, softball, volleyball, golf, cross country, track, cheerleading, dance, archery, and swimming. In the future, the school expects to add 4 more varsity teams, such as tennis, bowling, wrestling, and soccer.

Clubs

 Aerospace Club
 Chess
 Community Service Club
 Creative Writing Club
 Fantasy Football Club
 Fishing Club
 French Club
 Glee Club
 High School Hangout
 Instrumental Music Club
 Life Skills Club
 Microwave Mug Cooking Club
 Senior Beta Club
 Show and Tell
 Student Leadership Club
 Tech/Coding Club
 eSports

References

External links
Rutherford County Virtual School
Rutherford County Schools

Public high schools in Tennessee
Schools in Rutherford County, Tennessee
Smyrna, Tennessee
Virtual learning environments